The Houmuwu ding, formerly called Simuwu ding, is a rectangular bronze ding (sacrificial vessel, one of the common types of Chinese ritual bronzes) of the ancient Chinese Shang dynasty. It is the heaviest piece of bronzeware to survive from anywhere in the ancient world. It was unearthed in Wuguan Village, Anyang, Henan in 1939.

Owner
The ding is named for the inscription in bronze ware script on the interior wall, which reads "Queen Mother Wu". This is the temple name of Fu Jing, a queen of Wu Ding. The ding was made after her death, presumably by her son, Zu Geng of Shang. Whilst the ding itself was unearthed in 1939, Fu Jing's tomb was not located until 1959, and was found to have been looted.

Description

The ding is of the rectangular type, with four legs. Compared to earlier ding, such as the Duling rectangular ding, it is wider and its walls are thicker, making it much more massive. Each side has a blank space in the middle, surrounded by a band of decoration featuring taotie (animal faced creatures) and kuilong (one-legged dragons). There are two handles, each decorated on the exterior with two tigers facing each other, their jaws closing around a human head in between them, an image which is also found on Fu Hao battle axes.

Inscription debate
The inscription was originally written as sīmǔwù (司母戊), but since the 1970s scholars have reached the consensus that the first character should be read as hou (后), meaning queen, which is the mirror-image of si (司), which is found in oracle bone script before. The National Museum of China has officially corrected its name. The original reading of the inscription would have meant that the owner of the ding was a wife of Wu Yi of Shang (reigned c. 1147–1112 BC), and the dedicator her son, Wen Ding (reigned c. 1112–1102 BC). However, understanding the first character as hou makes it the temple name of Fu Jing, who lived earlier.

Unearthing 
The Houmuwu ding was unearthed in the Wu Guan Village, Anyang City, Henan Province.

See also 
 List of Chinese cultural relics forbidden to be exhibited abroad

References

Bibliography

Shang dynasty bronzeware
1939 archaeological discoveries
Collection of the National Museum of China
Yinxu
Shang Dings
Henan cultural relics